The ChampionsWorld Series was a club association football exhibition competition hosted in North America, held in the summers of 2003 and 2004.

The entire 2003 competition took place in the United States, with the match between Milan and Juventus doubling up as the 2003 Supercoppa Italiana.  The 2004 edition had two games held in Canada.

2003 edition

Teams

Matches

2004 edition

Teams

Matches

Notes

American soccer friendly trophies
2003 establishments in the United States
2004 disestablishments in the United States
Recurring sporting events established in 2003
Recurring sporting events disestablished in 2004